Antonio Mangiacavalli (15th century - 16th century) was an Italian sculptor of the Renaissance.

Biography
Born in Como, Antonio Mangiacavalli was active in Brescia between the 15th and 16th centuries.
 
Mangiacavalli is best known for his funerary monument of Nicolò Orsini, a condottiero, created in the 16th century. It is preserved in the Santa Giulia Museum in Brescia. His best documented work is the entry portal of the Duomo of Salò, executed between 1506 and 1508 in collaboration with Gasparo Cairano.

References

Bibliography
 

Renaissance sculptors
15th-century Italian sculptors
Italian male sculptors
16th-century Italian sculptors